The 2018–19 season was Port Vale's 107th season of football in the English Football League, and second consecutive season in EFL League Two. The season covers the period from 1 July 2018 through to 30 June 2019.

Neil Aspin marked his first summer transfer window as the club's manager with ten new permanent signings and five loan players in order to build his own squad, all of which were free signings except for striker Ricky Miller. The season started with five defeats in the opening seven games, before a 1–1 draw at Forest Green Rovers on 8 September marked a turnaround in results and performances. The team suffered 4–0 and 6–2 defeats at home to Lincoln City in the first round of the EFL Cup and in the league, though managed to win 1–0 at local rivals Crewe Alexandra to maintain a lower mid-table position from the end of August to the end of October. In the EFL Trophy, the two home group games set record low attendances at Vale Park and Nelson Agho became the youngest player in the club's history at age of 15 years and 262 days. They won all three group games to advance to the knockout stages, where they were drawn against Stoke City U21 – the Academy team of Potteries derby rivals Stoke City; Vale won the match 4–0 in front of a season high crowd of 7,940, but hooligans amongst the Stoke supporters caused around £100,000 of damage to Vale Park and surrounding areas of Burslem.

Vale suffered a miserable December following their win over Stoke, drawing three and losing two of their five league games against teams around them in the bottom half of the table. They did manage to pick up a 1–1 draw at league leaders Lincoln City on New Year's Day, though after the game Aspin considered leaving the club after feeling that supporters had shown him a "lack of respect". He chose to stay and oversaw a run to the EFL Trophy quarter-finals, where Vale ended up being knocked out by Bristol Rovers. However he resigned on 30 January following a run of one win in ten league games. He was succeeded by John Askey, who managed to turn the team's form around after losing his first four games in charge. As relegation seemed increasingly unlikely, attention them turned to ownership issues, as fans protested against chairman Norman Smurthwaite. Rejecting offers to buy the club, Smurthwaite claimed that he would put the club into administration on 5 May if he was still the club's owner. Carol and Kevin Shanahan completed their takeover on 7 May.

Overview

EFL League Two
Neil Aspin's first signing of the window was 33-year-old goalkeeper Scott Brown, who had been an ever-present for Wycombe Wanderers when they won promotion out of EFL League Two the previous season. Aspin stated that Brown's experience would help with organising the Vale's young defenders on the pitch. He quickly followed this by bringing in 30-year-old Carlisle United midfielder Luke Joyce on a two-year contract and 24-year-old Alfreton Town winger Brendon Daniels on a six-month contract, describing Joyce as "vastly experienced" and Daniels as "a local lad who is desperate to prove himself". Next to arrive were centre-backs Leon Legge and Connell Rawlinson, arriving on free transfers after leaving Cambridge United and The New Saints respectively. Aspin said that he hoped the experience of Legge would aid the development of young centre-half Nathan Smith. His sixth signing was central midfielder Manny Oyeleke, who had just left National League side Aldershot Town after picking up their Player of the Year award. After a wait of some weeks, the seventh incoming player was revealed to be attacker Louis Dodds, who joined on a season-long loan from relegated Chesterfield; he had previously played for the Vale from 2008 to 2016. Aspin said that Dodds had been keen on a return to Vale Park and "he has cost us next to nothing really". Vale then acquired the services of Peterborough United striker Ricky Miller after paying an undisclosed fee; 29-year-old Miller had scored a remarkable goal tally in the National League but had thus far failed to establish himself in the Football League in a career hindered by legal troubles. Another Peterborough forward then arrived, this time 18-year-old Idris Kanu on a season-long loan, whilst defender Theo Vassell was also signed on a one-year deal from Aspin's former club Gateshead. Going the other way, 20-year-old forward Dan Turner joined Scottish Championship club Falkirk on a six-month loan deal – which was terminated early on 5 October. Taking his place at Vale Park was Scott Quigley, signed on a season-long loan from Blackpool. Aspin also went on to sign former Stevenage midfielder Tom Conlon, who had impressed whilst on trial.

Vale kicked off the season at home to Cambridge United on 4 August, and made a flawless start with both Tom Pope and Ricky Miller getting off the mark in a 3–0 victory. However the following performance was poor, as they fell to a 2–0 defeat at Colchester United. Aspin made his fourth loan signing of the summer later that week, bringing in 19-year-old Aston Villa full-back Mitch Clark as cover for James Gibbons and Cristian Montaño. Clark went straight into the starting eleven at home to Crawley Town on 18 August, and helped the new look defence to a clean sheet and 1–0 win despite the away side dominating the play for much of the second half. However three days later Vale were beaten 2–1 at Carlisle United, with Aspin blaming the referee for making a "poor decision" to give a first-half penalty against Rawlinson. Vale then went on to lose 1–0 at newly-promoted Tranmere Rovers, after which Aspin again bemoaned the officials, stating that his team should have been given a penalty. Aspin went on to say "We had an apology from the Lincoln game to say it wasn't a penalty, we’ve had an apology to say we should have had a penalty in the Carlisle game and an apology to say we should have had a penalty in the Tranmere game." Having managed to offload unwanted striker Tyrone Barnett on loan to Cheltenham Town, Aspin then signed 20-year-old box-to-box midfielder Lewis Hardcastle on a season-long loan from Blackburn Rovers and also brought in Ben Whitfield; Aspin had attempted to sign Whitfield in January before falling out with the player's agent.

Vale opened September at home to Newport County, and though Pope scored to make himself the all-time top-scorer at the Vale Park stadium with 56 goals, Vale still went on to lose the game 2–1 after again being denied a penalty. Away at Forest Green Rovers, Vale turned around a one-goal half-time deficit to draw 1–1 after Pope converted a penalty won by Miller; Rovers ended the match with ten men after Farrend Rawson was shown a straight red card. They then went on to beat Northampton Town 2–0, with Whitfield and Oyeleke the scorers; Oyeleke was named in the EFL team of the week and his goal was listed as the League Two goal of the weekend. Over 1,900 Vale fans went on to travel nearby rivals Crewe Alexandra and witnessed a 1–0 victory thanks to a 75th-minute Legge header, ending a run of ten months without an away victory. Second-place Exeter City then came to Burslem and took a 1–0 lead that they defended until the seventh minute of injury-time, at which point Kanu scored a dramatic late equaliser, his first goal in professional football.

Vale opened October with a difficult home tie with Milton Keynes Dons, and lost 2–0 after playing with ten men after 65 minutes when half-time substitute Montaño went off injured; Aspin defended his decision to put Montaño on as his final substitution by saying "If he wasn't 100 per cent fit, he wouldn't have been on the bench... How stupid do you think I am?" Vale then went on to lose 2–0 at second-from-bottom Grimsby Town, having gone one goal behind within the opening minute following a mistake from Clarke; after the game Aspin attempted to confront some hecklers who had abused him. League leaders Lincoln City then returned to Vale Park on 13 October, and as they did in the EFL Cup won comfortably, leading the game after three minutes and going 3–0 up by half-time before winning the match 6–2; Aspin said it was like "torture" to watch the game but that "I would only leave if I was sacked and that is not the case". Four of Lincoln's goals came from set pieces. They recovered from this performance and picked up a hard-fought 1–0 victory at Oldham Athletic seven days later, which led Aspin to say that the team was united and that he had never "lost the dressing room". Aspin named the same team away at Stevenage, which ended in a 0–0 draw. Vale then closed out the month with a 1–0 win at home to Bury, Pope scoring against the run of play early in the second half after the team held on to a clean sheet following a difficult opening half.

Despite investing heavily in the summer, Notts County came to Vale Park on 3 November just one place above the relegation zone, and both sides had to be satisfied with a 2–2 draw after a late diving header from Pope rescued a point just two minutes after Elliott Ward had put County ahead on 87 minutes; in the first half Kane Hemmings had cancelled out Luke Hannant's early header. Both Aspin and County manager Harry Kewell claimed their sides deserved to win the game. Two weeks later, Vale travelled to Mansfield Town and fell to a 1–0 defeat, with Oyeleke sent off on his return from injury after receiving two yellow cards. Vale then slipped to a 1–0 defeat at home to Swindon Town in front of just 3,877 spectators for a Saturday fixture, and failed to create any meaningful chances throughout the game. However they saw out the month with a comfortable 3–0 victory at Yeovil Town; two of the goals came from Montaño, who had been highly criticised for his performance in the defeat to Swindon.

On 8 December, Vale seemed to be heading for 2–0 defeat at Morecambe with a poor performance when, on 83 minutes, Antony Kay successfully evaded the home side's offside trap on a free-kick to pull a goal back, and then Pope scored an equalizing goal four minutes later; Brown then immediately gave away a penalty, which was missed by former Vale striker A-Jay Leitch-Smith to leave the final score at 2–2. Struggling Cheltenham Town came to Burslem the following week amidst awful weather conditions, and just 3,109 spectators witnessed a 2–2 draw, Kay secured a point with a stoppage-time header. No goals were scored in the trip to the league's bottom club Macclesfield Town – a club that had rediscovered their National League winning form under new manager Sol Campbell; the clean sheet and a third consecutive draw were earned largely thanks to some impressive first-half saves from Brown. Grimsby Town were the visitors at Vale Park on Boxing day and they came away with a 1–0 win; Wes Thomas scored the only goal of the game on 62 minutes. Oldham arrived in Burslem three days later, having sacked manager Frankie Bunn following a 6–0 defeat; Vale crashed to a 4–1 defeat to the managerless "Latics" to put intense pressure on Aspin.

Vale travelled to league leaders Lincoln City on New Year's Day and looked to be leaving with a 1–0 defeat despite a very credible performance, before Oyeleke scored a spectacular stoppage-time equaliser to secure a point; after the game Aspin threatened to quit the club after feeling that supporters had shown him a "lack of respect". After taking time to consider his position he said that he would remain as manager as he had the support of the players and the chairman. On 12 January, Vale fell to a 3–0 home defeat to Colchester, losing Pope to a hamstring injury in the process and Aspin bemoaned his side's poor run of luck. Two days later he signed versatile defender Adam Crookes on loan from Nottingham Forest, who had previously been recalled from a loan at Lincoln City after failing to break into the first-team there. Another new arrival was 23-year-old striker Danny Elliott, who was signed following a trial; he had previously been playing in the Spanish Tercera División for San Cristoba. With Pope ruled out of action for over a month with a hamstring injury, Miller was restored to the starting eleven at Crawley on 19 January and scored the only goal of the game to maintain the club's five-point gap above the relegation zone. Aspin went on to bring in 20-year-old Wales youth international forward Mark Harris on loan from Cardiff City. However he was again facing questions over his own future following a 1–0 home defeat to promotion-chasing Carlisle United; Vale had actually looked good for a point until conceding a deflected goal on 79 minutes despite having Miller sent off for a reckless challenge just before half-time. They closed out the month with a 0–0 draw at Newport County, though ended a third consecutive game with only ten men as Gibbons was given a straight red card with five minutes left to play. Aspin tendered his resignation the following day, stating that "I am very proud of the job we [he and assistant Lee Nogan] did in keeping the club in League Two and we leave the club in a better place on and off the pitch". Despite having no manager, the club completed the loan signing of West Bromwich Albion defender Kyle Howkins, who had joined the club on loan at the same point of the 2017–18 season. Three more young midfield players were also signed, Callum Whelan and Toby Edser on loan from Manchester United and Nottingham Forest respectively, and Daniel Trickett-Smith from Leek Town – who was immediately returned on loan to Leek.

Former Macclesfield and Shrewsbury boss John Askey was appointed as the club's new manager on 4 February, signing a contract to run until the end of the season; he named Dave Kevan as his assistant. Five days later he took charge of his first game away at 20th-placed Cambridge, who leapfrogged the Vale with a 1–0 win. Askey named the same team at home to 22nd-placed Morecambe, and despite dominating the first-half they failed to score past an in-form Mark Halstead, with Pope missing a penalty; a 75th-minute Aaron Collins goal won all three points for the visitors, dragging Vale to within just five points of the bottom of the league. A 2–1 defeat at home to Tranmere three days later left Vale in 21st-place; James Norwood bagged a brace, before Whitfield's consolation ended Vale's club-record run of 571 minutes without scoring a goal. Askey switched to 4–4–2 and instigated four personnel changes for the trip to Cheltenham Town, but the end result was a fourth straight defeat and a run of one goal scored in seven matches. Vale had a goal wrongly disallowed for offside against Cheltenham and launched an official complaint to the Match Official Administration System, also citing six further major incidents in games earlier in the season that had cost the club vital points.

Vale faced a crucial trip to Meadow Lane to face bottom-club Notts County on 2 March and kept a clean sheet and extended their gap over the relegation zone to four points with a goalless draw, though they dominated the game and wasted numerous chances to secure a much needed victory. Third-placed Mansfield then came to Burslem, with both sides' top-scorer absent (Pope injured and Tyler Walker suspended); Miller came into the side and scored two early second-half goals to secure an important 2–1 win, with Brown again impressing after saving a first-half penalty given away by Legge. Three days later Vale put themselves eight points clear of the relegation zone with a comfortable 3–0 home win over Yeovil; Oyeleke, Conlon and Montaño were the scorers; Colnon's goal was a goal of the season contender, and he and David Worrall played particularly well in a dominant midfield performance. The unbeaten run stretched to four games with a 0–0 draw in fierce windy conditions at Swindon. Forest Green ended the unbeaten run after the play-off chasing visitors left Burslem with a 2–0 victory, Reece Brown bagging a brace in the last minute of stoppage time after breaking the deadlock on 69 minutes; Askey bemoaned "poor" officiating in his post-match interview. Vale seemed to be heading for a defeat at Northampton after Legge was sent off just before half-time with the "Cobblers" 1–0 ahead, but Worrall scored a 44th-minute equaliser and Pope came on to convert a 75th-minute penalty; Pope's 100th goal for the club secured a 2–1 victory.

Vale banished any remaining fears of relegation on 6 April by completing the double over local rivals Crewe Alexandra, with Pope scoring the only goal of the game on 78 minutes. They faced an uphill battle at Exeter seven days later after Howkins gave away a penalty in the opening minute, and were second-best all afternoon to the play-off hopefuls as the "Grecians" claimed a 2–0 win. Askey then made four changes for the return fixture with Stevenage, but a poor performance saw them slip to a 4–1 defeat, though the scoreline was generous to the "Boro". Askey started with Elliot away at promotion-chasing MK Dons, a 1–1 draw in which Brown saved a first-half penalty and Conlon scored a fine opening goal. However Askey went on to criticise unnamed squad members for unprofessional behaviour, saying that "...there are things that have gone on in my short stay here that shouldn't go on. I have had to deal with things I have never dealt with in 30 odd years of being in football". Vale's final home game of the season was a 1–0 defeat to Askey's former club Macclesfield, who desperately needed the victory to stay in the league. The final away game of the season was a 1–1 draw at already-promoted Bury.

With a final position of 20th being the joint-lowest in the club's history (along with 1979–80 and 2017–18), albeit with an improved points tally of 49, Askey released nine of the ten out of contract players: Dior Angus, Harry Benns, Mike Calveley, Danny Elliott, Luke Hannant, Antony Kay, Michael Tonge, Dan Turner and Theo Vassell, with Sam Hornby the only one to be offered a new deal (he rejected the deal and instead joined Bradford City). He also transfer listed Connell Rawlinson and Ben Whitfield. Askey himself signed a new three-year contract, whilst Leon Legge and David Worrall also signed contract extensions. However Ricky Miller left the club after his contract was terminated one year early by mutual consent.

Finances & ownership issues
Norman Smurthwaite returned formally to the role of Port Vale chairman on 1 August. The club started a new kit wear deal with Australian firm BLK. Smurthwaite was quoted as saying he would provide £400,000 for Aspin to spend in the January transfer window, funded by the proceeds of the cup windfalls and sale of Jordan Hugill. Smurthwaite was hospitalised after being struck by a car whilst walking outside Vale Park on 25 January. Smurthwaite blamed "logistical challenges" for the deal to bring back former top-scorer Marc Richards breaking down on 31 January (transfer deadline day); the club instead signed four youngsters despite having no manager. As the transfer window was closing, the Port Vale Supporters' Club unanimously gave a vote of no confidence in Smurthwaite and elected to begin formal protests against his ownership. Smurthwaite went on to issue a statement to condemn "disgraceful abuse" he had received and to urge supporters to not to use "inappropriate language" during protests and to consider the effect of protests on the club and the players; he stated that he was only involved in "major" decisions at the club and left day-to-day decisions to CEO Colin Garlick. Responding to accusations that the club had been operating "on the cheap", chief executive Colin Garlick stated that the club had the tenth-largest playing budget in League Two. On 1 March, Synectics Solutions owners Carol and Kevin Shanahan revealed that Smurthwaite had rejected their improved offer of £3.5 million for the club. When the couple told Smurthwaite they were planning to go public about their offer he texted them to say "sorry not interested. now please get back to your day job and continue the sterling work in the community."

On 23 March, Smurthwaite claimed that fans protests against him had cost the club a £500,000 stadium sponsorship deal, that he had never received a "formal offer" for the club and that he would put the club into administration if no new owner was in place by 5 May. Carol and Kevin Shanahan immediately put in a new offer for the club, leaving CEO Colin Garlick "very optimistic" of a deal being completed. Smurthwaite then stated that an Asian consortium wanted to enter exclusive talks to buy the club for £2.8m. Carol and Kevin Shanahan signed an exclusivity agreement to buy the club on 2 April. They completed their takeover of both the club and the ground on 7 May, ending Smurthwaite's seven years in charge.

Cup competitions
The first round draw of the FA Cup saw Port Vale drawn at home to League One side Sunderland. A heavy defeat seemed a distinct possibility after they went 2–0 down inside 20 minutes, but Aspin changed formation and put on Oyeleke, who helped Pope to inspire a goal before half-time, though the team could not find the equaliser and were denied a strong penalty appeal by referee Anthony Backhouse.

Port Vale were drawn at home to League Two rivals Lincoln City in the First Round of the EFL Cup, and made an early exit after losing 4–0 despite making only making three changes from the starting eleven that opened the league campaign. This was the club's biggest home defeat in the competition's history and the 2,440 attendance was the lowest at Vale Park in the competition since October 1981.

Vale's opponents in the Group Stage of the EFL Trophy were League One sides Burton Albion and Walsall, along with Academy side Middlesbrough. They opened the group at home to Burton on 9 October, and won the 1–0 game thanks to a goal from substitute Ricky Miller; just 601 spectators showed up for the match, a new record low attendance for a first-team fixture at Vale Park. This record was broken seven days later as Vale recorded a 2–0 win over Middlesbrough U21, with Rawlinson joining Miller on the scoresheet. They then went on to finish as group winners after beating Walsall 2–1 at the Bescot Stadium, a game in which Nelson Agho came off the bench to become the youngest player in the club's history at the age of 15 years and 262 days.

In the second round of the EFL Trophy Vale faced a home tie with Stoke City U21 – the youth-team of Potteries derby rivals Stoke City – and easily won the match 4–0 after naming a strong starting eleven, including opening goalscorer Pope. Despite it being their under-21 team, almost 4,000 Stoke fans attended the fixture to make the total attendance 7,940, in what Staffordshire Police described as their biggest footballing operation for 10 years. After the game a portion of Stoke supporters vandalized Vale Park and surrounding areas of Burslem, Chief Superintendent Wayne Jones stated that "We're talking about a minority of 150-200 people who had no interest in the football and were there for the trouble they expected to be played out and intended to cause disorder and damage." Smurthwaite estimated the repair bill at being close to £100,000.

On 8 January, third round opponents Shrewsbury Town visited Vale Park and made 11 changes to their side that drew with Stoke City in the FA Cup three days earlier. The League One "Shrews" still proved a challenge and it took an 83rd-minute strike from Pope to take the game to a penalty shoot-out, which Vale won 4–3 whilst Aspin faced away as he was too nervous to watch. Vale exited the competition at the quarter-final stage after falling to a 3–0 defeat at struggling League One side Bristol Rovers; Conlon picked up two bookings shortly after half-time and a 61st-minute Tom Nichols penalty then stretched Bristol's lead to two goals and cued up a comfortable win for the home side.

Results

Pre-season

EFL League Two

League table

Results by matchday

Matches

FA Cup

EFL Cup

EFL Trophy

Squad statistics

Appearances and goals

Top scorers

Disciplinary record

Awards

Transfers

Transfers in

Transfers out

Loans in

Loans out

References

Notes

Port Vale F.C. seasons
Port Vale